David Baron is an American comic book colorist from San Diego.

Career
Baron began his career at the age of 15, working for the coloring house InColor. He was subsequently hired by Wildstorm FX. After several years there, he left to pursue a freelance career. His work has primarily appeared in books published by WildStorm and DC Comics. Notably, he was the primary colorist on The Authority during the Mark Millar and Frank Quitely era, spent several years coloring JLA, and has recently colored several issues of DC Comics's weekly series, 52.

David Baron was under contract with DC Comics until July 2009.

Bibliography
Green Arrow and Black Canary
Justice League Elite
JLA
Team Zero
Batman Confidential
JLA: Classified
JSA: Classified
Global Frequency #1-11 (with writer Warren Ellis and various artists, 12-issue limited series, Wildstorm, 2002–2004)
52
Countdown #38-49 (DC Comics, 2008)

References

External links

David Baron's blog

Artists from San Diego
Year of birth missing (living people)
Place of birth missing (living people)
Living people
Comics colorists